Haralambie Ivanov (23 February 1941 – 22 August 2004) was a Romanian sprint canoeist who competed in the mid to late 1960s. Competing in two Summer Olympics, he won a silver in the K-4 1000 m event at Mexico City in 1968. Ivanov also won six medals at the ICF Canoe Sprint World Championships with four golds (K-1 4 x 500 m: 1963, K-2 500 m: 1963, K-2 1000 m: 1963, K-4 1000 m: 1966), a silver (K-4 1000 m: 1963), and a bronze (K-1 4 x 500 m: 1966). He died in Crișan, Tulcea in 2004.

References

External links 
 
 

1941 births
2004 deaths
Canoeists at the 1964 Summer Olympics
Canoeists at the 1968 Summer Olympics
Olympic canoeists of Romania
Olympic silver medalists for Romania
Romanian male canoeists
Romanian people of Russian descent
Olympic medalists in canoeing
ICF Canoe Sprint World Championships medalists in kayak
Medalists at the 1968 Summer Olympics